Cristofano dell'Altissimo (c. 1525–1605) was an Italian painter in Florence.

For duke Cosimo I de' Medici he copied in Como at least 280 of the portraits from the Collection of Paolo Giovio known as the Giovio Series (484 in total).

Most of them can be seen at the Uffizi Gallery in Florence.

Bibliography

 Aleci, Linda Kinger. "Images of Identity: Italian Portrait Collections of the Fifteenth and Sixteenth Centuries." "The Image of the Individual: Portraits in the Renaissance" Eds. Nicholas Mann and Luke Syson. London: British Museum Press, 1998. 67–79.
 Campbell, Lorne. Renaissance Portraits: European Portrait-Painting in the 14th, 15th and 16th Centuries. New Haven: Yale University Press, 1990.
 Fossi, Gloria. Uffizi Gallery: Art, History, Collections. Firenze: Firenze Musei, 2001.
 Giovio, Paolo. An Italian Portrait Gallery. Translated by Florence Alden Gragg. Boston: Chapman & Grimes, 1935.
 Haskell, Francis. History and its Images: Art and the Interpretation of the Past. Yale University Press. 1995. , 
 Müntz, Eugène. "Le Musée de portraits de Paul Jove. Contributions pour servir à l’iconographie du moyen âge et de la renaissance," Mémoires de l'Institut nationale de France, Académie des inscriptions et belles-lettres, Vol. 36, no. 2, 1900. 249–343.
 Zimmermann, T. C. Price. Paolo Giovio: The Historian and the Crisis of Sixteenth-Century Italy. Princeton, NJ: Princeton University Press, 1995.

External links

Silvia Meloni Trkulja: CRISTOFANO di Papi dell'Altissimo in Dizionario Biografico degli Italiani, vol. 31, Roma 1985 

1520s births
1605 deaths
16th-century Italian painters
Italian male painters
17th-century Italian painters
Painters from Florence
Italian portrait painters